{{DISPLAYTITLE:3D4}}In mathematics, the Steinberg triality groups of type 3D4 form a family of Steinberg or twisted Chevalley groups. They are quasi-split forms of D4, depending on a cubic Galois extension of fields K ⊂ L, and using the triality automorphism of the Dynkin diagram D4. Unfortunately the notation for the group is not standardized, as some authors write it as 3D4(K) (thinking of 3D4 as an algebraic group taking values in K) and some as 3D4(L) (thinking of the group as a subgroup of D4(L) fixed by an outer automorphism of order 3). The group 3D4 is very similar to an orthogonal or spin group in dimension 8.

Construction

The simply connected split algebraic group of type D4 has a triality automorphism σ of order 3 coming from an order 3 automorphism of its Dynkin diagram. If L is a field with an automorphism τ of order 3, then this induced an order 3 automorphism τ of the group D4(L). The group 3D4(L) is the subgroup of D4(L) of points fixed by στ.  It has three 8-dimensional representations over the field L, permuted by the outer automorphism τ of order 3.

Over finite fields

The group 3D4(q3) has order
q12
(q8 + q4 + 1)
(q6 − 1)
(q2 − 1).
For comparison, the split spin group D4(q) in dimension 8 has order  
q12
(q8 − 2q4 + 1)
(q6 − 1)
(q2 − 1)
and the quasisplit spin group 2D4(q2) in dimension 8 has order 
q12
(q8 − 1)
(q6 − 1)
(q2 − 1).

The group 3D4(q3) is always simple.  The Schur multiplier is always trivial.  The outer automorphism group is cyclic of order f where q3 = pf and p is prime.

This group is also sometimes called 3D4(q), D42(q3), or a twisted Chevalley group.

3D4(23)

The smallest member of this family of groups has several exceptional properties not shared by other members of the family.  It has order 211341312 = 212⋅34⋅72⋅13 and outer automorphism group of order 3.

The automorphism group of 3D4(23) is a maximal subgroup of the Thompson sporadic group, and is also a subgroup of the compact Lie group of type F4 of dimension 52. In particular it acts on the 26-dimensional representation of F4. The dual of this lattice has 819 pairs of vectors of norm 8/3, on which 3D4(23) acts as a rank 4 permutation group.

The group 3D4(23) has 9 classes of maximal subgroups, of structure
 21+8:L2(8) fixing a point of the rank 4 permutation representation on 819 points.
 [211]:(7 × S3)
 U3(3):2
 S3 × L2(8)
 (7 × L2(7)):2
 31+2.2S4
 72:2A4
 32:2A4
 13:4

See also

List of finite simple groups
2E6

References

External links
3D4(23) at the atlas of finite groups
3D4(33) at the atlas of finite groups

Finite groups
Lie groups